The Institute for Student Achievement (ISA) partners with schools and school districts to improve secondary education, particularly for students who are historically underserved. ISA was founded in 1990 by philanthropists Gerard and Lilo Leeds, became a division of Educational Testing Service (ETS) in 2013, and presently supports 29 schools and 12 school districts in New Jersey, Maryland, Virginia, New York, Ohio, North Carolina, and Pennsylvania. 17 of those 29 schools are in New York City.
 
Since 2017, the organization has been led by Dr. Stephanie Wood-Garnett. From 2000 to 2016, the organization was headed by Gerry House, formerly school superintendent of the Memphis, Tennessee school system.

In 2015, ISA was approved by the United States Department of Education as a whole-school reform model, having submitted at least one study that met the What Works Clearinghouse standards. 

ISA's school improvement model is framed by what its website describes as seven "research-based principles" leading to greater student achievement and improved high school graduation and "college-going" rates.

In October of 2019, Learning Policy Institute published a brief about ISA partner school Bronxdale High School, called Teaching the Way Students Learn Best.

References

External links
 ISA Website

Educational organizations based in the United States